The 2003–2004 FIG Rhythmic Gymnastics World Cup series was a series of stages where events in rhythmic gymnastics were contested. The series consisted of a two-year long competition, culminating at a final event — the World Cup Final in 2004. A number of qualifier stages were held. The top 3 gymnasts and groups in each apparatus at the qualifier events would receive medals and prize money. Gymnasts and groups that finished in the top 8 also received points which were added up to a ranking that qualified for the biennial World Cup Final.

Stages

Medalists

Individual

All-around

Hoop

Ball

Clubs

Ribbon

Group

All-around

5 ribbons

3 hoops and 2 balls

See also
 2003–2004 FIG Artistic Gymnastics World Cup series

References

Rhythmic Gymnastics World Cup
2003 in gymnastics
2004 in gymnastics